Arthur Dalzell may refer to:

 Arthur Dalzell, 13th Earl of Carnwath (1851–1941), British Army officer
 Arthur Alexander Dalzell, 9th Earl of Carnwath (1799–1875), Scottish nobleman and soldier